Neotiara pallida is a species of sea snail, a marine gastropod mollusk in the family Mitridae, the miters or miter snails.

Description

Distribution
Found in the Caribbean Sea, Gulf of Mexico and Lesser Antilles.

References

Mitridae
Gastropods described in 1959